The 2001–02 Montreal Canadiens season was the club's 93rd season. After missing the playoffs in the three preceding seasons, the Canadiens returned to the Stanley Cup playoffs. The Canadiens were eliminated in the Eastern Conference Semifinals by the Carolina Hurricanes by a series score of 4–2.

Off-season

Regular season
The Canadiens season began with a shocking announcement that team captain Saku Koivu was suffering from intra-abdominal non-Hodgkin's lymphoma, a form of cancer. This condition kept him out of all but three games in the regular season. On October 5, to respond to Koivu's absence, General Manager Andre Savard signed veteran forward Doug Gilmour to address the absence. The team began the season hovering around the .500 mark, but a five-game winning streak to end November, highlighted by spectacular performances by goaltender Jose Theodore, allowed the Canadiens to climb into the playoff mix. Around this time, Savard added offensive power to the team by acquiring Donald Audette and Shaun Van Allen from the Dallas Stars in exchange for Martin Rucinsky and Benoit Brunet. Head Coach Michel Therrien and the Canadiens had a rough December, posting a record of 4–8–2–1 while the newly acquired Audette had his forearm tendons sliced by the skate of New York Rangers forward Radek Dvorak. His season was jeopardized. Despite the inconsistency of the team, Theodore was spectacular in net. In January, the Canadiens played more .500 hockey, which prompted Savard to make a change. He traded forward Brian Savage to the Phoenix Coyotes in exchange for Sergei Berezin. The regular season went on hold for two weeks while the 2002 Winter Olympics were taking place. When play resumed, Jose Theodore took matters into his own hands and carried the Habs into the playoffs, finishing the regular season with a record of 30–24–10, seven shutouts and a goals against average of 2.11. In the 80th game of the regular season, captain Saku Koivu returned from treatment and played his first game of the season against the Ottawa Senators. He played for the team for the rest of the season. The Canadiens made the playoffs with a record of 36–31–12–3 behind the play of eventual Hart Memorial Trophy winner Jose Thoedore.

The Canadiens finished the regular season having allowed the fewest power play goals, with just 38.

Final standings

Playoffs
In the first round of the playoffs, the Canadiens were matched against the Boston Bruins, who finished first overall in the Eastern Conference. Donald Audette lead the way with three goals and Saku Koivu had a goal and an assist to win game one 5–2 for Montreal. Game 2 would prove to be a back-and-forth affair, as both teams traded momentum. Boston won the game by a score of 6–4 despite a four-point performance from the Canadien Richard Zednik. The series shifted to Montreal, and the Canadiens won Game 3 5–3 through by a four-point performance by Koivu. This gave Montreal a 2–1 series lead. The Bruins responded in Game 4 as they won easily, 5–2. Theodore rose to the occasion in Game 5, stopping 43 of 44 shots for a 2–1 win to give the Canadiens a 3–2 series lead going back to the Molson Centre. Theodore was spectacular again in Game 6, and Yanic Perreault scored the game-winning goal to give the Canadiens a 2–1 victory. The Canadiens won the series in six games, upsetting the Conference's top seed.

The Canadiens faced the Carolina Hurricanes in the second round of the playoffs. The Hurricanes won Game 1 2–0 as Hurricanes goaltender Kevin Weekes was awarded the shutout. The Carolina Hurricanes dominated the Canadiens outshooting them 46 to 16, but Theodore only yielded one goal and Koivu had a goal and an assist and the Canadiens won Game 2 4–1 to tie the series. Game 3 went to overtime and due to the heroics of Theodore, he kept his team in the game. The Habs would win Game 3 just over two minutes into overtime on a goal by Donald Audette, giving the Canadiens the series lead. The Habs had momentum in Game 4, establishing a 3–0 lead early in the third period of Game 4. The Hurricanes, however, would score three-straight goals to send the game to overtime, where 'Canes defenceman Niclas Wallin ended the game in overtime to tie the series at 2–2. With newly gained series momentum, the Hurricanes would win the next two games to win take the series at 4–2, outscoring Montreal 13–3 in the process.

Schedule and results

Regular season

|- align="center" bgcolor="#CCFFCC"
|1||W||October 4, 2001||6–4 || align="left"| @ Ottawa Senators (2001–02) ||1–0–0–0||2 || 
|- align="center"
|2||T||October 6, 2001||2–2 OT|| align="left"|  Toronto Maple Leafs (2001–02) ||1–0–1–0||3 || 
|- align="center" bgcolor="#CCFFCC"
|3||W||October 9, 2001||3–1 || align="left"|  Mighty Ducks of Anaheim (2001–02) ||2–0–1–0||5 || 
|- align="center" bgcolor="#CCFFCC"
|4||W||October 12, 2001||3–1 || align="left"| @ Columbus Blue Jackets (2001–02) ||3–0–1–0||7 || 
|- align="center" bgcolor="#CCFFCC"
|5||W||October 13, 2001|| 3–1 || align="left"|  New Jersey Devils (2001–02) ||4–0–1–0||9 || 
|- align="center" bgcolor="#FFBBBB"
|6||L||October 15, 2001|| 1-2 || align="left"| New York Rangers (2001-02) ||4-1-1-0||9 || 
|- align="center" bgcolor="#FFBBBB"
|7||L||October 19, 2001||1–4 || align="left"| @ Washington Capitals (2001–02) ||4–2–1–0||9 || 
|- align="center" bgcolor="#FFBBBB"
|8||L||October 20, 2001||1–3 || align="left"|  Buffalo Sabres (2001–02) ||4–3–1–0||9 || 
|- align="center" bgcolor="#CCFFCC"
|9||W||October 26, 2001||5–2 || align="left"| @ Buffalo Sabres (2001–02) ||5–3–1–0||11 || 
|- align="center" bgcolor="#FFBBBB"
|10||L||October 27, 2001||1–5 || align="left"|  Philadelphia Flyers (2001–02) ||5–4–1–0||11 || 
|- align="center" bgcolor="#FFBBBB"
|11||L||October 30, 2001||1–3 || align="left"| @ Edmonton Oilers (2001–02) ||5–5–1–0||11 || 
|-

|- align="center" bgcolor="#FFBBBB"
|12||L||November 1, 2001||0–4 || align="left"| @ Vancouver Canucks (2001–02) ||5–6–1–0||11 || 
|- align="center" bgcolor="#FFBBBB"
|13||L||November 3, 2001||2–6 || align="left"| @ Calgary Flames (2001–02) ||5–7–1–0||11 || 
|- align="center"
|14||T||November 6, 2001||1–1 OT|| align="left"|  Colorado Avalanche (2001–02) ||5–7–2–0||12 || 
|- align="center" bgcolor="#CCFFCC"
|15||W||November 8, 2001||3–1 || align="left"|  Nashville Predators (2001–02) ||6–7–2–0||14 || 
|- align="center" bgcolor="#CCFFCC"
|16||W||November 10, 2001||3–2 || align="left"|  New York Islanders (2001–02) ||7–7–2–0||16 || 
|- align="center" bgcolor="#FF6F6F"
|17||OTL||November 11, 2001||2–3 OT|| align="left"| @ New York Rangers (2001–02) ||7–7–2–1||17 || 
|- align="center" bgcolor="#FFBBBB"
|18||L||November 13, 2001||3–5 || align="left"| @ Boston Bruins (2001–02) ||7–8–2–1||17 || 
|- align="center" bgcolor="#CCFFCC"
|19||W||November 17, 2001||1–0 OT|| align="left"|  Florida Panthers (2001–02) ||8–8–2–1||19 || 
|- align="center" bgcolor="#CCFFCC"
|20||W||November 20, 2001||3–2 || align="left"|  Boston Bruins (2001–02) ||9–8–2–1||21 || 
|- align="center" bgcolor="#CCFFCC"
|21||W||November 22, 2001||5–2 || align="left"| @ Atlanta Thrashers (2001–02) ||10–8–2–1||23 || 
|- align="center" bgcolor="#CCFFCC"
|22||W||November 24, 2001||5–3 || align="left"|  Washington Capitals (2001–02) ||11–8–2–1||25 || 
|- align="center" bgcolor="#CCFFCC"
|23||W||November 27, 2001||5–1 || align="left"|  Atlanta Thrashers (2001–02) ||12–8–2–1||27 || 
|- align="center"
|24||T||November 29, 2001||1–1 OT|| align="left"| @ New York Islanders (2001–02) ||12–8–3–1||28 || 
|-

|- align="center" bgcolor="#FFBBBB"
|25||L||December 1, 2001||1–3 || align="left"|  New York Rangers (2001–02) ||12–9–3–1||28 || 
|- align="center" bgcolor="#FFBBBB"
|26||L||December 3, 2001||2–3 || align="left"|  Chicago Blackhawks (2001–02) ||12–10–3–1||28 || 
|- align="center" bgcolor="#FFBBBB"
|27||L||December 5, 2001||1–2 || align="left"|  New Jersey Devils (2001–02) ||12–11–3–1||28 || 
|- align="center"
|28||T||December 8, 2001||3–3 OT|| align="left"|  Phoenix Coyotes (2001–02) ||12–11–4–1||29 || 
|- align="center" bgcolor="#CCFFCC"
|29||W||December 10, 2001||4–0 || align="left"|  Minnesota Wild (2001–02) ||13–11–4–1||31 || 
|- align="center"
|30||T||December 12, 2001||3–3 OT|| align="left"| @ Atlanta Thrashers (2001–02) ||13–11–5–1||32 || 
|- align="center" bgcolor="#CCFFCC"
|31||W||December 13, 2001||3–2 || align="left"| @ Philadelphia Flyers (2001–02) ||14–11–5–1||34 || 
|- align="center" bgcolor="#FFBBBB"
|32||L||December 15, 2001||4–6 || align="left"| @ Toronto Maple Leafs (2001–02) ||14–12–5–1||34 || 
|- align="center" bgcolor="#FFBBBB"
|33||L||December 17, 2001||3–4 || align="left"|  Tampa Bay Lightning (2001–02) ||14–13–5–1||34 || 
|- align="center" bgcolor="#CCFFCC"
|34||W||December 19, 2001||3–1 || align="left"| @ Pittsburgh Penguins (2001–02) ||15–13–5–1||36 || 
|- align="center" bgcolor="#FFBBBB"
|35||L||December 20, 2001||0–5 || align="left"| @ Boston Bruins (2001–02) ||15–14–5–1||36 || 
|- align="center" bgcolor="#CCFFCC"
|36||W||December 22, 2001||2–1 || align="left"|  Los Angeles Kings (2001–02) ||16–14–5–1||38 || 
|- align="center" bgcolor="#FFBBBB"
|37||L||December 26, 2001||1–3 || align="left"| @ Buffalo Sabres (2001–02) ||16–15–5–1||38 || 
|- align="center" bgcolor="#FFBBBB"
|38||L||December 28, 2001||0–3 || align="left"| @ St. Louis Blues (2001–02) ||16–16–5–1||38 || 
|- align="center" bgcolor="#FF6F6F"
|39||OTL||December 29, 2001||5–6 OT|| align="left"| @ New York Islanders (2001–02) ||16–16–5–2||39 || 
|-

|- align="center" bgcolor="#FFBBBB"
|40||L||January 3, 2002||2–5 || align="left"| @ Vancouver Canucks (2001–02) ||16–17–5–2||39 || 
|- align="center" bgcolor="#CCFFCC"
|41||W||January 5, 2002||4–2 || align="left"| @ Calgary Flames (2001–02) ||17–17–5–2||41 || 
|- align="center" bgcolor="#FFBBBB"
|42||L||January 6, 2002||6–7 || align="left"| @ Edmonton Oilers (2001–02) ||17–18–5–2||41 || 
|- align="center" bgcolor="#FFBBBB"
|43||L||January 8, 2002||2–4 || align="left"| @ Minnesota Wild (2001–02) ||17–19–5–2||41 || 
|- align="center" bgcolor="#CCFFCC"
|44||W||January 10, 2002||4–0 || align="left"|  New York Islanders (2001–02) ||18–19–5–2||43 || 
|- align="center"
|45||T||January 12, 2002||1–1 OT|| align="left"| @ Toronto Maple Leafs (2001–02) ||18–19–6–2||44 || 
|- align="center" bgcolor="#FFBBBB"
|46||L||January 14, 2002||3–5 || align="left"|  Philadelphia Flyers (2001–02) ||18–20–6–2||44 || 
|- align="center" bgcolor="#CCFFCC"
|47||W||January 16, 2002||2–0 || align="left"|  Washington Capitals (2001–02) ||19–20–6–2||46 || 
|- align="center"
|48||T||January 17, 2002||1–1 OT|| align="left"| @ Carolina Hurricanes (2001–02) ||19–20–7–2||47 || 
|- align="center" bgcolor="#CCFFCC"
|49||W||January 19, 2002||5–1 || align="left"| @ Tampa Bay Lightning (2001–02) ||20–20–7–2||49 || 
|- align="center" bgcolor="#FFBBBB"
|50||L||January 21, 2002||5–7 || align="left"| @ Florida Panthers (2001–02) ||20–21–7–2||49 || 
|- align="center" bgcolor="#CCFFCC"
|51||W||January 23, 2002||5–3 || align="left"| @ Washington Capitals (2001–02) ||21–21–7–2||51 || 
|- align="center"
|52||T||January 26, 2002||1–1 OT|| align="left"|  Ottawa Senators (2001–02) ||21–21–8–2||52 || 
|- align="center" bgcolor="#CCFFCC"
|53||W||January 27, 2002||3–1 || align="left"|  San Jose Sharks (2001–02) ||22–21–8–2||54 || 
|- align="center" bgcolor="#FF6F6F"
|54||OTL||January 30, 2002||3–4 OT|| align="left"|  Boston Bruins (2001–02) ||22–21–8–3||55 || 
|-

|- align="center" bgcolor="#CCFFCC"
|55||W||February 5, 2002||1–0 || align="left"| @ New Jersey Devils (2001–02) ||23–21–8–3||57 || 
|- align="center" bgcolor="#CCFFCC"
|56||W||February 7, 2002||1–0 || align="left"|  Pittsburgh Penguins (2001–02) ||24–21–8–3||59 || 
|- align="center" bgcolor="#FFBBBB"
|57||L||February 9, 2002||1–4 || align="left"| @ Toronto Maple Leafs (2001–02) ||24–22–8–3||59 || 
|- align="center" bgcolor="#FFBBBB"
|58||L||February 11, 2002||2–3 || align="left"|  Detroit Red Wings (2001–02) ||24–23–8–3||59 || 
|- align="center" bgcolor="#FFBBBB"
|59||L||February 26, 2002||2–5 || align="left"|  Ottawa Senators (2001–02) ||24–24–8–3||59 || 
|- align="center" bgcolor="#CCFFCC"
|60||W||February 27, 2002||3–2 || align="left"| @ Chicago Blackhawks (2001–02) ||25–24–8–3||61 || 
|-

|- align="center" bgcolor="#FFBBBB"
|61||L||March 2, 2002||3–4 || align="left"|  Carolina Hurricanes (2001–02) ||25–25–8–3||61 || 
|- align="center" bgcolor="#CCFFCC"
|62||W||March 4, 2002||5–3 || align="left"|  Atlanta Thrashers (2001–02) ||26–25–8–3||63 || 
|- align="center" bgcolor="#CCFFCC"
|63||W||March 6, 2002||5–3 || align="left"|  Boston Bruins (2001–02) ||27–25–8–3||65 || 
|- align="center" bgcolor="#FFBBBB"
|64||L||March 8, 2002||0–3 || align="left"| @ Buffalo Sabres (2001–02) ||27–26–8–3||65 || 
|- align="center"
|65||T||March 9, 2002||1–1 OT|| align="left"|  Toronto Maple Leafs (2001–02) ||27–26–9–3||66 || 
|- align="center" bgcolor="#FFBBBB"
|66||L||March 11, 2002||1–2 || align="left"| @ New York Rangers (2001–02) ||27–27–9–3||66 || 
|- align="center"
|67||T||March 14, 2002||3–3 OT|| align="left"|  Dallas Stars (2001–02) ||27–27–10–3||67 || 
|- align="center" bgcolor="#CCFFCC"
|68||W||March 16, 2002||3–2 || align="left"|  Carolina Hurricanes (2001–02) ||28–27–10–3||69 || 
|- align="center"
|69||T||March 18, 2002||1–1 OT|| align="left"| @ Carolina Hurricanes (2001–02) ||28–27–11–3||70 || 
|- align="center" bgcolor="#CCFFCC"
|70||W||March 20, 2002||4–1 || align="left"| @ Florida Panthers (2001–02) ||29–27–11–3||72 || 
|- align="center"
|71||T||March 22, 2002||3–3 OT|| align="left"| @ Tampa Bay Lightning (2001–02) ||29–27–12–3||73 || 
|- align="center" bgcolor="#FFBBBB"
|72||L||March 23, 2002||1–5 || align="left"| @ Nashville Predators (2001–02) ||29–28–12–3||73 || 
|- align="center" bgcolor="#FFBBBB"
|73||L||March 26, 2002||1–2 || align="left"|  Florida Panthers (2001–02) ||29–29–12–3||73 || 
|- align="center" bgcolor="#CCFFCC"
|74||W||March 28, 2002||2–1 || align="left"|  Tampa Bay Lightning (2001–02) ||30–29–12–3||75 || 
|- align="center" bgcolor="#CCFFCC"
|75||W||March 30, 2002||2–1 OT|| align="left"|  Pittsburgh Penguins (2001–02) ||31–29–12–3||77 || 
|-

|- align="center" bgcolor="#CCFFCC"
|76||W||April 1, 2002||3–0 || align="left"| @ Pittsburgh Penguins (2001–02) ||32–29–12–3||79 || 
|- align="center" bgcolor="#CCFFCC"
|77||W||April 4, 2002||3–1 || align="left"| @ Philadelphia Flyers (2001–02) ||33–29–12–3||81 || 
|- align="center" bgcolor="#CCFFCC"
|78||W||April 6, 2002||4–1 || align="left"|  Columbus Blue Jackets (2001–02) ||34–29–12–3||83 || 
|- align="center" bgcolor="#CCFFCC"
|79||W||April 7, 2002||3–1 || align="left"| @ Ottawa Senators (2001–02) ||35–29–12–3||85 || 
|- align="center" bgcolor="#CCFFCC"
|80||W||April 9, 2002||4–3 || align="left"|  Ottawa Senators (2001–02) ||36–29–12–3||87 || 
|- align="center" bgcolor="#FFBBBB"
|81||L||April 12, 2002||2–5 || align="left"| @ New Jersey Devils (2001–02) ||36–30–12–3||87 || 
|- align="center" bgcolor="#FFBBBB"
|82||L||April 13, 2002||0–3 || align="left"|  Buffalo Sabres (2001–02) ||36–31–12–3||87 || 
|-

|-
| Legend:

Playoffs

|- align="center" bgcolor="#CCFFCC"
| 1 ||W|| April 18, 2002 || 5–2 || align="left"| @ Boston Bruins || Canadiens lead 1–0 || 
|- align="center" bgcolor="#FFBBBB"
| 2 ||L|| April 21, 2002 || 4–6 || align="left"| @ Boston Bruins || Series tied 1–1 || 
|- align="center" bgcolor="#CCFFCC"
| 3 ||W|| April 23, 2002 || 5–3 || align="left"| Boston Bruins || Canadiens lead 2–1 || 
|- align="center" bgcolor="#FFBBBB"
| 4 ||L|| April 25, 2002 || 2–5 || align="left"| Boston Bruins || Series tied 2–2 || 
|- align="center" bgcolor="#CCFFCC"
| 5 ||W|| April 27, 2002 || 2–1 || align="left"| @ Boston Bruins || Canadiens lead 3–2 || 
|- align="center" bgcolor="#CCFFCC"
| 6 ||W|| April 29, 2002 || 2–1 || align="left"| Boston Bruins || Canadiens win 4–2 || 
|-

|- align="center" bgcolor="#FFBBBB"
| 1 ||L|| May 3, 2002 || 0–2 || align="left"| @ Carolina Hurricanes || Hurricanes lead 1–0 || 
|- align="center" bgcolor="#CCFFCC"
| 2 ||W|| May 5, 2002 || 4–1 || align="left"| @ Carolina Hurricanes || Series tied 1–1 || 
|- align="center" bgcolor="#CCFFCC"
| 3 ||W|| May 7, 2002 || 2–1 OT || align="left"| Carolina Hurricanes || Canadiens lead 2–1 || 
|- align="center" bgcolor="#FFBBBB"
| 4 ||L|| May 9, 2002 || 3–4 OT || align="left"| Carolina Hurricanes || Series tied 2–2 || 
|- align="center" bgcolor="#FFBBBB"
| 5 ||L|| May 12, 2002 || 1–5 || align="left"| @ Carolina Hurricanes || Hurricanes lead 3–2 || 
|- align="center" bgcolor="#FFBBBB"
| 6 ||L|| May 13, 2002 || 2–8 || align="left"| Carolina Hurricanes || Hurricanes win 4–2 || 
|-

|-
| Legend:

Player statistics

Scoring
 Position abbreviations: C = Centre; D = Defence; G = Goaltender; LW = Left Wing; RW = Right Wing
  = Joined team via a transaction (e.g., trade, waivers, signing) during the season. Stats reflect time with the Canadiens only.
  = Left team via a transaction (e.g., trade, waivers, release) during the season. Stats reflect time with the Canadiens only.

Goaltending
  = Joined team via a transaction (e.g., trade, waivers, signing) during the season. Stats reflect time with the Canadiens only.

Awards and records
 Jose Theodore, Hart Memorial Trophy
 Jose Theodore, Roger Crozier Saving Grace Award
 Jose Theodore, Vezina Trophy
 Saku Koivu, Bill Masterton Memorial Trophy

Transactions
The Canadiens were involved in the following transactions from June 10, 2001, the day after the deciding game of the 2001 Stanley Cup Finals, through June 13, 2002, the day of the deciding game of the 2002 Stanley Cup Finals.

Trades

Players acquired

Players lost

Signings

Draft picks
Montreal's draft picks at the 2001 NHL Entry Draft held at the National Car Rental Center in Sunrise, Florida.

See also
 2001–02 NHL season

Notes

References

Montreal Canadiens seasons
Montreal Canadiens season, 2001–02
Montreal